Dobos is a Hungarian surname meaning drummer. Notable people with the surname include:

Attila Dobos (born 1978), Hungarian footballer
Gábor Dobos (born 1976), Hungarian sprinter
Julius Dobos (born 1976), Hungarian composer and music producer
Krisztina Dobos (1949–2013), Hungarian educator, economist and politician

See also
 Dobo (disambiguation)
 Dobó, a Hungarian surname

Hungarian-language surnames